Moran Mar Ignatius Abded Aloho II Sattuf also Ignatius Abdullah ll Stephan (June 7, 1833 –November 26, 1915) was the Patriarch of Antioch, and head of the Syriac Orthodox Church from 1906 until his death in 1915.

Biography
Abded was born on June 7, 1833 in the village of Sadad, a predominantly Syriac Orthodox village, south of Homs. He became a monk at an early age, and was later ordained priest. In 1870, he toured the Tur Abdin region and recorded the names of villages, monasteries, churches, clergy and the families living in the area.

He was appointed bishop of Jerusalem in 1872 by Patriarch Ignatius Peter IV, taking the name Gregorios, and in August 1874 accompanied him to Britain to persuade the British government to assist the church in India. They stayed here until April 1875, when they left for India to reorganise the church in India with the help of the British governor. Whilst in India, Abded fraternised with Protestant missionaries. After returning to Syria he spread Protestant ideas.

They left India in May 1877 and remained in Syria before returning to London in 1879, where he secured a printing press for the Monastery of Mor Hananyo. Upon his return, Abded was ordained Bishop of Homs and Hama and left to attend the 1888 Lambeth Conference, and secured a second printing press.

After the death of Ignatius Peter IV in 1894, a rivalry began between Abded and Abded Mshiho to be elected to the patriarchal throne. According to American missionaries operating in Syria at the time, the Ottoman government interfered and intimidated bishops based on the highest bidder. However, in 1895, Abded Mshiho was elected and consecrated patriarch.

The following year, in 1896, Abded joined the Syriac Catholic Church . He was a Syrian Uniate for 9 years. In 1905, Abded renounced the church and took up his position as Syriac Orthodox Metropolitan of Amid again, under the promise of becoming the Patriarch upon its vacancy.

Patriarch of Antioch
The Patriarch, Ignatius Abdul Masih II, was deposed in 1903 by the Ottoman government, and Metropolitan Abded was elected as new Patriarch of Antioch as Ignatius Abded Aloho II effective 1906. The circumstances of how Patriarch Ignatius Abded Mshiho II was 
deposed and why is highly controversial within the Syriac Orthodox church. Supporters of Abded Sattuf claim the patriarch Abded Msiho had converted to Catholicism and was excommunicated by the Holy Synod as a result(in reality not ) . Some others claimed that the Patriarch had developed serious drinking problems particularly after the 1895 Massacres of Diyarbakırin that his indigent Ottoman Sultan took him to visit the seen of his disciples are beheaded and raped,then forcefully fed with booze and opium  through a funnel placed in his mouth while retaining him in a pole , then they left him near a Christian village mounting him in a donkey to intimidate his followers , so that his own people will think bad about him and that's why a number of Syriac bishops demanded he be deposed. Whereas supporters of Abded Mshiho claim Abded Sattuf bribed the Ottoman Government to issue a firman deposing Abded 0Mshiho as Patriarch and that he was not excommunicated by the Holy Synod. Supporters of Abdedshihiyo claimed that Abded Sattuf claimed the patriarchal throne by paying £500 to secure his election and was enthroned on August 15, 1906 as an exception that he was never been a Maphrian and left for London shortly after.

Whilst in London, Abded Sattuf met with King Edward VII twice and received a medal. He travelled to India in 1908 and began ordaining Indian bishops much to the chagrin of the local church. This led to the demand of a Maphrian or Catholicos to prevent the Malankara Church coming under Abded's control. In 1910, Abded established the Knanaya (Autonomous Archdioceses and consecrated Geevarghese Mor Severios on August 28, 1910. In 1912, the dispute over authority between supporters of the Metropolitan and supporters of the Patriarch finally divided the Malankara Church, with the former group becoming the essentially independent Malankara Orthodox Syrian Church headed by the Catholicos of the East and the latter maintaining ties with the Patriarch of Antioch as the Malankara Jacobite Syrian Christian Church. Motions by the church leaders and two Supreme Court decisions in the 20th century failed to heal the rift.

He also travelled to Jerusalem in 1912.

Abded resided at the Monastery of Saint Mark from March 17, 1912 until his death on November 26, 1915, where he was also buried.

References

Syriac Orthodox Patriarchs of Antioch
1833 births
1915 deaths
19th-century people from the Ottoman Empire
20th-century people from the Ottoman Empire
20th-century Oriental Orthodox archbishops
19th-century Oriental Orthodox archbishops
Oriental Orthodox bishops in the Ottoman Empire